Impulse Airlines was an independent airline in Australia which operated regional and low-cost trunk services between 1992 and 2004. It was acquired by Qantas in 2001 to form the basis of Qantas' new regional airline QantasLink. The airline had its head offices on the grounds of Sydney Airport in Mascot.

History

Establishment
Impulse Airlines was established in 1992 and started operations on 18 December 1992. It commenced regional airline services in March 1994 following the acquisition by the Impulse Transportation Group of Port Macquarie based Oxley Airlines established in 1974. Impulse Airlines was based in Newcastle. The Airline's Managing Director was Gerry McGowan until the McGowan family sold the airline to Qantas in 2001. The airline operated a network of regional routes throughout New South Wales and into Queensland. The network included routes to Armidale, Barcaldine, Biloela, Blackwater, Brisbane, Canberra, Coffs Harbour, Coolangatta, Cooma, Grafton, Glen Innes, Hervey Bay, Kempsey,  Maroochydore, Maryborough, Melbourne, Roma, Newcastle, Port Macquarie, Sydney, Tamworth and Taree. The airline operated a fleet of Beechcraft 1900 aircraft. It was affiliated with the Ansett frequent flyer programme and its flights had designated AN flight numbers.

In August 1994, Impulse Airlines expanded its fleet and became the first Australian operator of the BAe Jetstream 41. It acquired five of the type in 1994 and had planned to acquire a further five in 1996. Impulse used the aircraft to pioneer non-stop services between Newcastle and Melbourne but was soon met with competition from Qantas who utilised the much larger BAe 146 on the route. Impulse was forced to discontinue the services and withdraw the Jetstream 41s from service. After Qantas lost interest in the route following Impulse's withdrawal, Impulse eventually re-entered the route with Beech 1900s in February 1997.

Low-cost airline
In June 2000, the airline acquired Boeing 717 jet aircraft and commenced operations as a low-cost airline on Australia's trunk eastern seaboard routes in direct competition with Qantas and Ansett. The airline had ceased its previous affiliation with Ansett. Services initially operated between Sydney and Melbourne and quickly expanded to include Brisbane, Newcastle and Hobart. Together with Virgin Blue which also commenced services in mid-2000, Impulse Airlines brought upon a substantial restructuring of the Australian airline industry. The new low cost entrants injected competition into the long-lived duopoly between Qantas and Ansett, arguably contributing to the downfall of the latter. The airline gradually began to phase in a bright blue livery with a cockatoo on the tail of its aircraft.

In April 2001, Impulse and Qantas came to an agreement where Impulse would wet lease all their services to Qantas with Qantas to market the routes and give Impulse a cash injection with a further option for Qantas to buy out the company. Qantas exercised that option in November 2001, and Impulse was absorbed into the QantasLink group of subsidiary airlines. The introduction of the cockatoo livery did not progress beyond a few aircraft. Both the Boeing 717 and Beech 1900 aircraft were initially utilised in the QantasLink fleet however the Beech 1900s were soon withdrawn from service while the Boeing 717 fleet was expanded.

In April 2003, following a long running investigation by the Australian Securities and Investments Commission, the then very well known stockbroking identity Rene Rivkin was found guilty of insider trading after having purchased 50,000 Qantas shares which resulted in a $346,000 profit. He was charged with using confidential and market-sensitive information with regards to an impending merger of Qantas and Impulse Airlines. He bought these shares on behalf of Rivkin Investments on 24 April 2001, just hours after speaking to the executive chairman of Impulse, Gerry McGowan.

The airline was a major sponsor of the Newcastle Knights National Rugby League team.

Jetstar
After QantasLink had acquired the 717 fleet in 2001 it was planned that Qantas would use it as a base for a budget airline to be launched in 2003. Impulse Airline's former 717s were used for Jetstar's initial fleet when the airline officially launched domestic passenger service between Newcastle and Melbourne on 24 May 2004, one day before Impulse Airlines ceased operations.

The facilities developed by Impulse Airlines for their Newcastle base continued to be used as a heavy maintenance base for Jetstar until June 2020, despite Jetstar's headquarters being in Melbourne.

Fleet

See also
 List of defunct airlines of Australia
 Aviation in Australia

References

 Regional Airline Directory, Australian Aviation Magazine, December 1994 p88. (ISSN 0813-0876)
 Regional Airline Directory, Australian Aviation Magazine, December 1997 p66. (ISSN 0813-0876)
 Regional Airline Directory, Australian Aviation Magazine, 'Annual 2002' p74. (ISSN 1445-9485)
 Flight International, 5–11 April 2005
 Airline Codes Website
 Jetstar website - 'About Us'.

External links

Impulse Airlines Former Boeing Fleet Detail

Qantas
Defunct airlines of Australia
Airlines established in 1992
Defunct low-cost airlines
Airlines disestablished in 2004
Former Oneworld affiliate members
Australian companies disestablished in 2004
Australian companies established in 1992